Josef Wenzel I (Josef Wenzel Lorenz; 9 August 1696 – 10 February 1772), often referred to as just Wenzel, was the Prince of Liechtenstein between 1712 and 1718, and 1748 and 1772, as well as regent of Liechtenstein between 1732 and 1745. He first succeeded his distant cousin Hans-Adam I, even though he was not next in line. The actual heir was his uncle Anton Florian, he was not very popular among the family and therefore Hans-Adam chose Josef Wenzel as his heir. He later decided to hand over the Principality in exchange for him getting the Dominion of Rumburk in 1718. Thirty years later he inherited Liechtenstein again after his nephew Prince Johann Nepomuk Karl died without male issue.

Biography
Born in 1696 at Prague, Josef Wenzel was the eldest son of Prince Philipp Erasmus of Liechtenstein (11 September 1664 – 13 January 1704) and Countess Christina Theresa von Löwenstein-Wertheim-Rochefort (12 October 1665 – 14 April 1730). He was a great-grandnephew of Karl, the first Prince of Liechtenstein. In 1712, he succeeded his distant cousin Hans-Adam I, as the Prince of Liechtenstein, even though he was not next in line. The actual heir was his uncle Anton Florian, he was not very popular among the family. Hans-Adam therefore chose Josef Wenzel as his heir, but in 1718 he negotiated with Anton Florian and later swapped the County of Vaduz and the Lordship of Schellenberg in exchange for the Dominion of Rumburk. He also married Anton Florian's daughter Anna Maria Antonie, who was Wenzel's cousin. A year later the two dominions were united into the new Principality of Liechtenstein. He then enjoyed a long life of military successes. Wenzel was primarily a general and was a very successful campaigner. His first venture was in 1717, when he fought against the Ottoman Turks in the Austro-Turkish War, alongside famed military commander Prince Eugene of Savoy. He also participated in the War of Polish succession, once again alongside Prince Eugene. In 1745, he was made Generalissimo in Italy and was victorious the following year at the Battle of Piacenza. In 1753 he was made General Chief Commander in Hungary. In one of the greatest achievements of his career, he reorganised the Habsburg artillery, partially financed out of his own pocket. He was the 698th Knight of the Order of the Golden Fleece in Austria. From 1735 to 1736, he was Imperial Envoy to Berlin and he was Imperial Ambassador to Paris between 1738 and 1741. In 1760, he escorted the future bride of Josef II to Vienna.

In 1732, Prince Josef Johann Adam died and was succeeded by his son Johann Nepomuk Karl. However, the new Prince was only eight years old at the time, so Wenzel was established as his regent and guardian until he came of age in 1745. Johann Nepomuk did not live long however, dying only three years later in 1748. With no surviving male issue, the Principality passed back to Wenzel. He then went on to rule Liechtenstein until his death in 1772. With no surviving issue, Liechtenstein went to his nephew Franz Josef I.

Legacy
Though not one of the more well known Princes of Liechtenstein, Josef Wenzel I is still remembered for his military campaigns, as well as his patronage to the arts.  When Hereditary Prince Alois's eldest son was born in 1995, Alois decided to name him Josef Wenzel after this Prince.

Marriage and issue
On 19 April 1718 Josef Wenzel married his cousin, Princess Anna Maria Antonie of Liechtenstein (1699–1753), daughter of Anton Florian and Eleonore Barbara von Thun und Hohenstein, in 1718. They had five children, all of whom died in early childhood:
Prince Philipp Anton (1719).
Prince Philipp Anton (1720).
Prince Philipp Ernst (1722–1723).
Princess Maria Elisabeth (1724).
Princess Marie Alexandra (1727).

References

External links 
 Princely House of Liechtenstein

1696 births
1772 deaths
Nobility from Prague
Knights of the Golden Fleece of Austria
Grand Crosses of the Order of Saint Stephen of Hungary
Princes of Liechtenstein
Generals of the Holy Roman Empire
18th-century Liechtenstein people
Military personnel from Prague
Diplomats from Prague